Ragvald Odenskarl or Ragnvald Odiakarl ('Ragnvald, Man of Odin'; died in 1484), was a Swede who was executed for being a declared follower of the Norse religion. His case is significant. It was very uncommon to openly declare oneself a "Pagan" during this period, and his testimony indicate that the old Pagan Norse religion were still practiced by some in Sweden as late as the 15th-century.

On 27 October 1484, Ragvald was put on trial in Stockholm for having stolen from churches in southern Uppland. Among them were Skepptuna Church (twice)  Markims Church, Orkesta Church and Vallentuna Church. He admitted to have committed the thefts in collaboration with a male accomplice named Johan Land, who was then subsequently arrested. To steal from a church was during this period not considered an ordinary theft, but also an act of sacrilege. Ragvald himself declared, that he had served the old Norse god Odin for seven years and was thus not a Christian but a follower of the Norse religion.

Ragvald Odenskarl is believed to have been executed by burning. His accomplice Johan Land avoided execution by asking to be made an executioner.

See also
 Eric Clauesson
 Lars Nilsson (shaman)

References 
 Christer Öhman (1994). Helgon, bönder och krigare. Berättelser ur den svenska historien.. Värnamo: Fälths. 
 Henrik Schück (1940). Stockholm i slutet av 1400-talet.. Stockholm. 

15th-century births
1484 deaths
People executed by Sweden by burning
Executed Swedish people
People executed by the Kalmar Union
15th-century Swedish people
People executed for heresy
Swedish pagans
Pagan martyrs